René Gaveau (1900–1972) was a French cinematographer and film director.

Selected filmography

Cinematographer
 André Cornélis (1918)
 My Uncle Benjamin (1924)
 Mandrin (1924)
 The Nude Woman (1926)
 André Cornélis (1927)
 Instinct (1930) 
 The Fortune (1931)
 Kiss Me (1932)
 Odette (1934)
 Compliments of Mister Flow (1936)
 White Cargo (1937)
 The Chess Player (1938)
 Radio Surprises (1940)
 President Haudecoeur (1940)
 The Blue Veil (1942)
 Mademoiselle Béatrice (1943)
 The White Waltz (1943)
 Night Shift (1944)
 Pamela (1945)
 The Last Metro (1945)
 The Mysterious Monsieur Sylvain (1947)
 The Cupid Club (1949)
 Night Round (1949)
 Last Love (1949)
 Rome Express (1950)
 Beautiful Love (1951)

Director
 Adam Is Eve (1954)

1900 births
1972 deaths
French cinematographers
French film directors
French film producers